Ba Jin (Chinese: 巴金; pinyin: Bā Jīn; 1904–2005) was a Chinese anarchist, translator, and writer. In addition to his impact on Chinese literature, he also wrote three original works in Esperanto, and as a political activist he wrote The Family.

Name 
He was born as Li Yaotang, with alternate name Li Feigan. He used the pen name Ba Jin, for which he is most known. The first character of his pen name may have been taken from Ba Enbo, a classmate of his who committed suicide in Paris, or from the first syllable of the surname of Russian anarchist Mikhail Bakunin, and the last character of which is the Chinese equivalent of the last syllable of Russian anarchist Peter Kropotkin (克鲁泡特金, Ke-lu-pao-te-jin). He was also sometimes known as Li Pei Kan.

Biography

Ba Jin was born in Chengdu, Sichuan. In 1919, Ba read Kropotkin's An Appeal to the Young and converted to anarchism.

It was partly owing to boredom that Ba Jin began to write his first novel, Miewang  (“Destruction”). In France, Ba Jin continued his anarchist activism, translating many anarchist works, including Kropotkin's Ethics, into Chinese, which was mailed back to Shanghai's anarchist magazines for publication.

During the Cultural Revolution, Ba Jin was heavily persecuted as a counter-revolutionary. His wife since 1944, Xiao Shan, died of cancer in 1972. He asked that a Cultural Revolution Museum be set up in 1981. The Shantou Cultural Revolution Museum referenced the influence of Ba Jin on its establishment through displaying a depiction of his at the entrance as well as a quote of his, "Every town in China should establish a museum about the Cultural Revolution."

Ba Jin's works were heavily influenced by foreign writers, including Émile Zola, Ivan Turgenev, Alexander Herzen, Anton Chekhov, and Emma Goldman.

Ba Jin suffered from Parkinson's disease beginning in 1983. The illness confined him to Huadong Hospital in Shanghai from 1998.

Bibliography

English translations
(1954) Living Amongst Heroes. Beijing: Foreign Language Press.
(1958) The Family. (trans. Sidney Shapiro) Beijing: Foreign Language Press.
(1959) A battle for life: a full record of how the life of steel worker, Chiu Tsai-kang, was saved in the Shanghai Kwangrze Hospital. Beijing: Foreign Language Press.
(1978) Cold Nights (trans. Nathan K. Mao and Liu Ts'un-yan) Hong Kong: Chinese University press.
(1984) Random Thoughts (trans. Germie Barm&ecute). Hong Kong: Joint Publishing Company. (Partial translation of Suizianglu)
(1988) Selected works of Ba Jin (trans. Sidney Shapiro and Jock Hoe) Beijing: Foreign Language Press. (Includes The Family, Autumn in Spring, Garden of Repose, Bitter Cold Nights)
(1999) Ward Four: A Novel of Wartime China (trans. Haili Kong and Howard Goldblatt). San Francisco: China Books and Periodicals, Inc.
(2005) "How to Build a Society of Genuine Freedom and Equality"(1921), "Patriotism and the Road to Happiness for the Chinese"(1921) and "Anarchism and the Question of Practice"(1927) in Anarchism: A Documentary History of Libertarian Ideas, Volume 1: From Anarchy to Anarchism (300CE-1939), ed. Robert Graham. Montreal: Black Rose Books.
(2012) Ward Four: A Novel of Wartime China (trans. Howard Goldblatt). San Francisco: China Books and Periodicals, Inc. .

Ba Jin stories in collections
Arzybasheff, M. (1927). "Morning Shadows?" in Tales of the Revolution. Tr. Percy Pinkerton. New York Huebsch.
(1927). "Workingman Shevyrev." in Tales of the Revolution, tr. Percy Pinkerton. New York: Huebsch.

Works

Short story collections
Vengeance 《复仇》, 1931
Dog 《狗》, 1931
Brightness 《光明》, 1932
The Electric Chair 《电椅》, 1933
Wiping Cloth 《抹布》, 1933
The General 《将军》, 1934
Gods, Ghosts and Men 《神·鬼·人》, 1935
Sinking 《沉落》, 1936
The Story of Hair 《发的故事》, 1936
Thunder 《雷》, 1937
Resurrection Grass 《还魂草》, 1942
Little People, Little Events 《小人小事》, 1943
Heroic Tales 《英雄的故事》, 1953
Pigs and Chickens 《猪与鸡》, 1959
Li Da-hai 《李大海》, 1961
Stories Outside the City, 1992

Children's literature
The Immortality Pagoda 《长生塔》, 1937
The Pearl and the Jade Concubine 《明珠和玉姬》, 1957

Novels and novellas
Destruction 《灭亡》, 1929
The Dead Sun 《死去的太阳》, 1931
The "Love" Trilogy 《爱情的三部曲》 (1931-5)
Fog 《雾》, 1931
Rain 《雨》, 1933
Lightning 《电》, 1935
New Life 《新生》, 1933
Miners 《砂丁》, 1933
Germination 《萌芽》, 1933
A Dream of the Sea 《海的梦》, 1932
Autumn in Spring 《春天里的秋天》, 1932
The "Torrents" Trilogy 《激流三部曲》
The Family 《家》, 1933
Spring 《春》, 1938
Autumn 《秋》, 1940
Lina 《利娜》, 1940
Fires 《火》(in three volumes), 1940–1945
Stars 《星》(English-Chinese bilingual), 1941
A Garden of Repose 《憩园》, novella, 1944
Ward No 4 《第四病室》, 1946
Cold Nights 《寒夜》, 1947

Autobiography and memoirs
Ba Jin: An Autobiography 《巴金自传》, 1934
I Remember 《忆》, 1936
Thinking Back on Childhood 《童年的回忆》, 1984

Non-fiction
(coauthor) Anarchism and its Practical Problems 《无政府主义与实际问题》, 1927
From Capitalism to Anarchism 《从资本主义到安那其主义》, 1930
A Walk by the Sea 《海行》, 1932
Travel Notes 《旅途随笔》, 1934
Droplets of Life 《点滴》, 1935
Confessions of Living 《生之忏悔》, 1936
Brief Notes 《短简》, 1937
I Accuse 《控诉》, 1937
Dreaming and Drunkenness 《梦与醉》, 1938
Thoughts and Feelings 《感想》, 1939
Black Earth 《黑土》, 1939
Untitled 《无题》, 1941
Dragons, Tigers and Dogs 《龙·虎·狗》, 1941
Outside the Derelict Garden 《废园外》, 1942
Travel Notes 《旅途杂记》, 1946
Remembering 《怀念》, 1947
Tragedy of a Still Night 《静夜的悲剧》, 1948
The Nazi Massacre Factory: Auschwitz 《纳粹杀人工厂—奥斯威辛》, 1951
Warsaw Festivals: Notes in Poland 《华沙城的节日—波兰杂记》, 1951
The Consoling Letter and Others 《慰问信及其他》, 1951
Living Amongst Heroes 《生活书局在英雄们中间》, 1953
They Who Defend Peace 《保卫和平的人们》, 1954
On Chekhov 《谈契河夫》, 1955
Days of Great Joy 《大欢乐的日子》, 1957
Strong Warriors 《坚强的战士》, 1957
A Battle for Life 《—场挽救生命的战斗》, 1958
New Voices: A Collection 《新声集》, 1959
Friendship: A Collection 《友谊集》, 1959
Eulogies: A Collection 《赞歌集》, 1960
Feelings I Can't Express 《倾吐不尽的感情》, 1963
Lovely by the Bridge 《贤良桥畔》, 1964
Travels to Dazhai 《大寨行》, 1965
Ba Jin: New Writings, 1978–1980
Smorching Smoke 《烟火集》, 1979
Random Thoughts 《随想录》, 1978–86
Thinking Back on Writing 《创作回忆录》 1981
Exploration and Memories 《探索与回忆》, 1982
Afterwords: A Collection 《序跋集》, 1982
Remembrance: A Collection 《忆念集》, 1982
Ba Jin: On Writing 《巴金论创作》, 1983
Literature: Recollections (with Lao She) 《文学回忆录》 1983
To Earth to Dust 《愿化泥土》, 1984
I Accuse: A Collection 《控诉集》, 1985
In My Heart 《心里话》, 1986
Ten Years, One Dream 《十年一梦》, 1986
More Thoughts 《再思录》, 1995

Letters
To Our Young Friends Looking for Aspirations 《寻找理想的少年朋友》, 1987
The Collection of the Snow and Mud – All the Remaining Letters Written by Ba Jin to Yang Yi 《雪泥集》, 1987
Collected Letters of Ba Jin 《巴金书信集》, 1991

Others
A Battle For Life
Partial excerpt of English translation of Ba Jin's dedication to Emma Goldman
How Are We To Establish A Truly Free And Egalitarian Society?, 1921
Nationalism and the Road to Happiness for the Chinese, 1921
Letter from Ba Jin to the CRIA (International Anarchist Liaison Commission, Paris), 18 March 1949
A Museum of the "Cultural Revolution", 1986

See also

 8315 Bajin
 Li Xiao
 Former Residence of Ba Jin
 List of Chinese authors
 Chinese literature

References

Further reading 

 Ayers, W. (1950). "Shanghai Labor and the May Thirtieth Movement," Papers on China, 5:1-38. Harvard University, East Asian Research Center.
 Bao-Puo. (1925). "The Anarchist Movement in China: From a Letter of a Chinese Comrade." Tr. from the Russian, in Freedom. 39.423:4.
 (1953). "The Society for Literary Studies, 1921-1930." Papers on China. 7:34-79. Harvard University, East Asian Research Center.
 Chen Tan-chen. (1963). "Pa Chin the Novelist: An Interview." Chinese Literature. 6:84-92.
 Ch'en Chia-ai character. "Chung-kuo li-shih shang chih an-na-ch'i-chu -i che character (Anarchists in Chinese history); in K'o-lu-p'ao-t'e-chin hsueh-shuo kai-yao. pp. 379-410.
 Hsin ch'ing-nien (1908). "Chinese Anarchist in Tokyo," Freedom, 22.23:52.
 Lang, Olga. Pa Chin and His Writings: Chinese Youth Between Two Revolutions. Cambdridge, Mass. Harvard University Press, 1967.
 Mao, Nathan K. Pa Chin. Boston: Twayne Publishers, 1978.
 Martin, H. and J. Kinkley, eds. (1992) Modern Chinese writers: self-portrayals. Armonk, NY: M.E. Sharpe.
 Pino, Angel, “Ba Jin and the ‘Arshinov Platform’”. libcom.org
 Pino, Angel, “Ba Jin as Translator,” tr. Ian MacCabe, in Peng Hsiao-yen & Isabelle Rabut (eds.), Modern China and the West: Translation and Cultural Mediation. Leiden-Boston: Brill, “East Asian Comparative Literature and Culture” (2), 2014, 28-105.
 
 Razak, Dzulkifli Abdul (Oct. 30, 2005). "Leaving behind their legacies". New Straits Times, p. F9.
 Renditions Autumn 1992. No. 38. "Special issue on Twentieth Century Memoirs. Reminiscences by well-known literary figures, including Zhu Ziqing, Ba Jin, Lao She and Wang Xiyan."

Films
Return from Silence: Five prominent and controversial Chinese writers speak on their roles in the modernization of China. (1 hour video cassette available) — The life and work of five esteemed Chinese writers whose modern classics shaped China's past: Ba Jin, Mao Dun, Ding Ling, Cao Yu, and Ai Qing. Produced by Chung-wen Shih, George Washington University, 1982.

External links

 "Literary witness to century of turmoil" China Daily (2003-11-24)
 "Chinese literary icon Ba Jin dies" (BBC)
 A giant of Chinese literature "A giant of Chinese literature" ~ The Sydney Morning Herald''' (21 October 2005)]
 Ba Jin at Anarchist Archives
 "When the Snow Melted" Translated by Tang Sheng at Words Without Borders''
 Pa Chin: A Literary and Revolutionary Chinese Anarchist ~ YemenTimes Newspaper
 Ba Jin: Life and Works
 Ba Jin. A Portrait by Kong Kai Ming at Hong Kong Baptist University Library

1904 births
2005 deaths
20th-century Chinese novelists
20th-century essayists
Recipients of the Fukuoka Prize
Anarchist writers
Chinese anarchists
Chinese anti-capitalists
Chinese atheists
Chinese autobiographers
Chinese centenarians
Chinese children's writers
Chinese Esperantists
Chinese male novelists
Chinese male short story writers
Commandeurs of the Légion d'honneur
Deaths from cancer in the People's Republic of China
Deaths from Parkinson's disease
Delegates to the 1st National People's Congress
Neurological disease deaths in the People's Republic of China
People's Republic of China essayists
People's Republic of China novelists
People's Republic of China short story writers
Recipients of the Order of Friendship of Peoples
Republic of China essayists
Republic of China novelists
Republic of China short story writers
Short story writers from Sichuan
Sichuan University alumni
Vice Chairpersons of the National Committee of the Chinese People's Political Consultative Conference
Victims of the Cultural Revolution
Writers from Chengdu
Writers of Esperanto literature
Men centenarians
20th-century pseudonymous writers